Kfir Edri (born October 12, 1976) is an Israeli former footballer who now works as a chairman for Bnei Yehuda Tel Aviv.

Honours

As a Player
Toto Cup: 1998–99, 2006–07

As a Manager
Israel State Cup: 2017

External links
 Player profile – Bnei Yehuda's website

Stats at ONE

1976 births
Living people
Israeli footballers
Hapoel Dimona F.C. players
Maccabi Tel Aviv F.C. players
F.C. Ashdod players
Hapoel Be'er Sheva F.C. players
Beitar Jerusalem F.C. players
Hapoel Tel Aviv F.C. players
Maccabi Petah Tikva F.C. players
Maccabi Herzliya F.C. players
Hapoel Kfar Saba F.C. players
Bnei Yehuda Tel Aviv F.C. players
Liga Leumit players
Israeli Premier League players
Israeli people of Moroccan-Jewish descent
Footballers from Dimona
Doping cases in association football
Association football defenders
Association football midfielders